Véra Belmont (born 17 November 1932) is a French film producer, director and screenwriter. Since 1960, she has produced 45 films, directed 5 films, and written 8 films. Her films were greatly inspired by François Truffaut and other members of the New Wave movement. Her 1985 film Red Kiss was entered into the 36th Berlin International Film Festival, where Charlotte Valandrey won the Silver Bear for Best Actress.

Filmography

References

External links

1932 births
Living people
French film producers
French women film directors
Writers from Paris
French women screenwriters
French screenwriters

French women film producers